My Life with Stars and Stripes is a 2003 film directed by and starring Massimo Ceccherini, released in Italian cinemas on October 31, 2003.

Plot
The placid life of Lando (Massimo Ceccherini), tuscan peasant is shocked by the sudden return of an aunt, who emigrated to the United States thirty years before, became a fat irreducible by appetite.
She is accompanied by her husband, an ex-marine crazy, Vietnam veteran, who knows by memory Apocalypse Now and gets up every morning at five, by his grandson, a nuisance affected by the mania of video games and, fortunately, even the shapely daughter (Victoria Silvestedt)
who intriguing Lando.
The American guests don't renounce to their habits: jogging; Halloween party, military march at 5 a.m., roast turkey for the Thanksgiving holiday, etc..
Lando, having reached the limit of endurance, it explodes and releases everything, but eventually the appeal of United States involves too.

External links
 

2003 films
Italian comedy films
Films set in Tuscany
Films produced by Fulvio Lucisano
2000s Italian films